Molly's Pilgrim is a 1985 American short film directed by Jeffrey D. Brown, based on the children's book of the same title by Barbara Cohen, who also appeared in the film as a crossing guard. It won an Oscar in 1986 for Best Short Subject.

Cast
 Lilly Balaban as Kate
 Jessica Bertan as Classroom student
 Travis Blank as Arthur
 Robert Clohessy as Gym Teacher
 Barbara Cohen as School Crossing Guard
 Greg Donohue as Classroom student
 Sophia Eliazova as Molly
 Marcus Reboa as Classroom student

References

External links
Molly's Pilgrim at the Phoenix Learning Group

1985 films
1985 short films
1985 independent films
American independent films
Live Action Short Film Academy Award winners
Films set in New Jersey
Films shot in New Jersey
1980s English-language films
1980s American films
American short films